There have been many official and unofficial Doctor Who and related spin-offs released on audio, as LPs, audiocassettes, audio CDs and MP3 CDs. Recordings here are listed by their original release date.

Television soundtracks
In 1966, an abridged recording of episode 6 of The Chase was released with narration on a 7-inch record. In 1979, the BBC released an abridged version of Genesis of the Daleks. In 1992 a brief series began releasing audio versions of missing stories from the archives, with link narration provided by one of the actors who played the Doctor. The soundtracks that were known to exist at the time were not the optimal audio quality and the range only released a few stories. A second series of "Lost Episode" soundtrack releases began in 1999. This series differed from earlier releases by having "linking" narration (to describe action and other sequences that were originally visual) read by an actor or actress who had played a companion in the original serial, rather than one of the actors who played the Doctor (except The Macra Terror, which used the original narration by Colin Baker). Another difference is that all the later releases were remastered for release by Mark Ayres from tapes recorded "off-air" at the original time of broadcast, or, when necessary, due to quality and possibly availability, from surviving films. From 1999 to 2004, these recordings were released under the "BBC Radio Collection" banner, and, starting in 2004, they have been released under the "BBC Audio" banner, with different outer packaging. The series was officially completed in 2006 with the release of The Reign of Terror; however, a rerelease of the soundtrack for The Tomb of the Cybermen was produced and was followed by new audio productions of available serials. All have been released by the BBC unless otherwise noted. This list is in order by release date.

Audio drama

Doctor Who

There have been several original audio dramas produced for Doctor Who, produced for radio and internet broadcast or commercial release.

Spin-offs

Torchwood
Torchwood has had seven Afternoon Plays, most bridging the gap between Series 2 and Children of Earth.

Kaldor City
A series of audio dramas set in Kaldor City on the unnamed planet featured in the Doctor Who serial The Robots of Death.

Faction Paradox
Audio dramas featuring the Faction Paradox, a time travelling cult/rebel group/organised crime syndicate originally appearing in the Eighth Doctor Adventures line of Doctor Who novels.

Dionus's War
Faction Paradox series begun in June 2021.

Hellscape
Faction Paradox series begun in January 2022.

The Minister of Chance
A series of audio dramas and novels featuring The Minister of Chance from Death Comes to Time.

Erimem
Audio dramas adapted from Thebes Publishing's line of Erimem novels featuring the Fifth Doctor companion from Big Finish Productions line of Doctor Who audio plays.

BBV audio
BBV has produced many Doctor Who audio spin-offs, official and unofficial. This list only covers the licensed spin-offs in which Doctor Who characters or races have been licensed from their creators. See also the Faction Paradox and Erimem sections above

Other

Documentaries and non-fiction

Documentaries

Interviews

Commentaries
DVD-style audio commentaries released on CD/download, without the original episode audio. All are moderated by Toby Hadoke unless otherwise indicated.

See also

 Doctor Who audio productions
 Doctor Who missing episodes
 List of Doctor Who audiobooks
 List of Doctor Who audio plays by Big Finish
List of Doctor Who spin off audio plays by Big Finish
 List of Doctor Who music releases

References

General references

Sources

 
Doctor Who spin-offs